The Benjamin Prize was established as a Norwegian prize to counter racism in 2002.  The prize is awarded in memory of Benjamin Hermansen, who at the age of 15 years, was murdered in Holmlia, Søndre Nordstrand in Oslo, Norway.  The death was racially motivated.  

The prize is awarded each year on 27 January in conjunction with the commemoration of the Holocaust. On this date Soviet forces liberated Nazi concentration camps in Auschwitz and Birkenau.  The prize is awarded to a school that actively works against racism and discrimination.  

The work for which the award is given is to be characterized by: 
 Anchoring: The school's work against racism and discrimination represent a long-term commitment. 
 Involvement: The school's work against racism and discrimination involves faculty and students at the school. 
 Highlighting: The school's work against racism and discrimination is visible both in the school and in the broader community. 

The prize consists of 250,000 kroner, and a miniature bust of Benjamin Hermansen, created by Ivar Sjaastad. The original bust is placed at Holmlia. 

The Norwegian Directorate for Education and Training awards the prize. The jury which determines the recipient consisted of Marit Hermansen (Benjamin’s mother) until her death in 2019. Since, it is representrd by members from the Antiracism Center, the Sami Parliament of Norway, Union of Education Norway, School Student Union of Norway, Parents Committee for Primary and Lower Secondary Education, and the Norwegian Center for Studies of Holocaust and Religious Minorities.

Winners 
 2002 — Sunndal high school in Sunndalsøra
 2003 — Fjell school in Drammen 
 2004 — Ila school in Trondheim 
 2005 — Gommerud school in Bærum 
 2006 — Mandal secondary school in Mandal
 2007 — Skotselv school in Øvre Eiker in Buskerud
 2008 — Sogn Upper Secondary School in Oslo
 2009 — Skullerud school in Oslo
 2010 — Hagaløkka school in Asker
 2011 — Karuss school in Kristiansand
 2012 — Greveskogen high school in Tønsberg
 2013 — Brandengen high school in Drammen
 2014 — Uranienborg skole in Oslo
 2015 — Sjøvegan high school in Salangen
 2016 – Løkenåsen skole in Lørenskog
 2017 — Høyland ungdomsskole in Sandnes
 2018 — Kuben Upper Secondary School in Oslo
 2019 — Alvimhaugen barneskole in Sarpsborg
 2020 — Glemmen videregående skole in Fredrikstad
 2021 – Sofienberg skole in Oslo

References

External links
Benjaminprisen  at Norwegian Directorate for Education and Training.

Anti-racism in Norway
Norwegian awards
Awards established in 2002
2002 establishments in Norway